The , NEXI, is a Japanese insurance corporation owned by the Japanese government. The current organization was formed as an Independent Administrative Institution on April 1, 2001 under the jurisdiction of the Ministry of Economy, Trade and Industry based on the General Rules for Incorporated Administrative Agency and Trade and Investment Insurance Act. It provides trade and investment insurance services to facilitate and enhance Japanese companies' international business.

See also
 Ministry of Economy, Trade and Industry
 Japan Bank for International Cooperation
 Japan External Trade Organization

References

External links
 NEXI

Financial services companies established in 2017
Defunct independent administrative institutions
Insurance companies of Japan
Japanese companies established in 2017